USS Osprey (AM-29) was an  commissioned by the United States Navy for service in World War I. She was responsible for removing mines from harbors, and, in her role as rescue and salvage ship, she was responsible for coming to the aid of stricken vessels.

Osprey was laid down 14 November 1917 by Gas Engine & Power Co. and Charles L. Seabury, Morris Heights, New York; launched 14 November 1918; sponsored by Mrs. J. J. Amory, and commissioned 7 January 1919.

European operations 
After fitting out at New York City, Osprey departed Boston, Massachusetts with five other ships on 6 April 1919 for Inverness, Scotland, arriving the 20th to join the North Sea Minesweeping Force. Basing operations at Kirkwall, Orkney Islands, she aided in taking up the North Sea Mine Barrage during the summer, departing Kirkwall on 1 October for Devonport. Osprey departed Brest for Lisbon the 15th, with sub-chaser #110 in tow. She departed Lisbon the 24th for home, arriving Staten Island, New York, 17 November. On 4 December, she proceeded to Portsmouth, New Hampshire, where she remained in ordinary until decommissioning 12 December 1920.

United States Coast and Geodetic Survey service 

Osprey then steamed to Boston and was transferred to the U.S. Coast and Geodetic Survey on 7 April 1922, at which time she was renamed USS Pioneer.

Return to the US Navy 
Operating with the U.S. Commerce Department as Pioneer, the ship was returned to the U.S. Navy and commissioned on 17 September 1941 as USS Crusader (ARS-2). The salvage ship operated in the 15th Naval District, headquartered at Balboa, Panama Canal Zone, throughout World War II.

Decommissioning 
After decommissioning, she was transferred to the Maritime Commission on 13 February 1947.

References

External links 

hazegray.org: USS Osprey

 

Lapwing-class minesweepers
Ships built in Morris Heights, Bronx
1918 ships
World War I minesweepers of the United States
Rescue and salvage ships of the United States Navy
Ships transferred from the United States Navy to the United States Coast and Geodetic Survey